Lady & Gentlemen is the tenth studio album by American singer LeAnn Rimes. The album is Rimes' second cover album (the first being her self-titled album). The only new songs on the album are the two bonus tracks, "Crazy Women" and "Give". It was released on September 27, 2011 by Curb Records. Rimes co-produced the album with country singer, Vince Gill, and Darrell Brown, with whom she collaborated on her 2007 album Family. A vinyl record of the album was released on the same day.

Background
Lady & Gentlemen consists of Rimes covering songs by male country artists, including Vince Gill, who helped produce the album, Merle Haggard, Kris Kristofferson, and Waylon Jennings. Rimes also "revisited" her 1996 debut single, "Blue" on the album, which she picked up the tempo on. The album was released on September 27, 2011 by Curb Records. A vinyl record of the album was released on the same day. Rimes co-produced the album with country singer, Vince Gill, and Darrell Brown, of whom she collaborated with on her 2007 album Family.

Singles
Three singles were released from the album. The first single released for the album was a cover of John Anderson's 1983 single, "Swingin'" on June 8, 2010. The second single, "Crazy Women", was released on December 10, 2010. A third single, "Give", was released on June 14, 2011.

Critical reception

Lady & Gentlemen received mostly positive reviews from most music critics. So far it has been given a score of 75 out of 100 from Metacritic. Allmusic editor Stephen Thomas Erlewine gave it 3.5 out of 5 stars and called it "a collection of masculine country classics reinterpreted by a female singer." Mikael Wood of Entertainment Weekly stated that the album "rarely sheds new light on the top-shelf material." Jonathan Keefe of Slant Magazine compared the album to Tanya Tucker's 2009 album, My Turn and stated that album finds Rimes "taking real risks and making better music than many of her contemporaries."
Randy Lewis of the Los Angeles Times claimed that Rimes "has been contending lately with flak from image-conscious types over paparazzi photos of her slimmed-down physique, but her leaner, meaner approach to a batch of classic country songs for her latest collection is mostly good news." Ben Ratliff of The New York Times stated that Rimes "can finally ease up on her default vocal style, brassy and belting, which is of course its own gender role."

Track listing

Personnel
Credits for Lady & Gentlemen adapted from liner notes.

Ben Fowler — additional recording
Brian Scheuble — additional engineering
Darrell Brown — executive producer, producer, arrangement, additional engineering
Chris Galland — assistant alternate mixing
Drew Bollman — recording
Erik Madrid — assistant alternate mixing
Jenny Gill — production assistant
John Hobbs — producer
Joshua Blanchard — assistant engineering
Justin Neibank — producer, mixer, recording
LeAnn Rimes — executive producer, producer, arrangement
Leigh Brannon - production assistant
Manny Marroquin - alternate mixing
Matt Rausch — assistant recording
Paul Smith — assistant recording
Ryder Brown — engineering intern
The Time Jumpers — band*
Vince Gill — producer, arrangement**

Notes
* The Time Jumpers appear courtesy of The Crosswind Music Group
**Vince Gill appears courtesy of MCA Nashville.

Charts

Album

Singles

References

External links
 Official Website

2011 albums
Albums produced by Darrell Brown (musician)
Albums produced by LeAnn Rimes
Covers albums
Curb Records albums
LeAnn Rimes albums